The OMR Festival, known as the Online Marketing Rockstars Festival (OMR)  is one of the world’s largest events for digital marketing and technology in 2017. Since its founding in 2011, the annual OMR Festival has taken place in Hamburg, Germany. The organizer of the event is Ramp 106 GmbH; the team of founders includes Philipp Westermeyer, Tobias Schlottke, Christian Müller and Christian Byza.

The OMR Festival is organized into two parallel events: the Expo and Conference.

OMR Expo 
The OMR Expo is a two-day trade fair, which in 2018 consisted of more than 300 international exhibitors from the sectors of adtech, affiliate marketing, analytics, marketing attribution, consulting, content marketing, data, display marketing, eCommerce, email marketing, gaming, HR, IT, influencer marketing, marketing cloud, mobile advertising, native advertising, performance marketing, programmatic advertising, publisher, search engine marketing, social media marketing, software and video advertising. In conjunction with the Expo is a program of events, including stages with live presentations, a variety of 90-minute seminars on specific digital marketing topics called Masterclasses and an Expo party. In 2018, the OMR Expo welcomed more than 40,000 attendees.

OMR Conference 

The OMR Conference is a one-day specialist conference focusing on digital marketing topics and traditionally takes place on the second day of the OMR Festival. In years past, a variety of international marketing experts have held presentations on the Conference Stage, including VaynerMedia founder Gary Vaynerchuk, Pinterest founder Evan Sharp, Youtuber Casey Neistat, BuzzFeed founder Jonah Peretti, Metallica founder Lars Ulrich, NYU Professor Scott Galloway and skateboarder Tony Hawk. The OMR Conference also includes the Aftershow Party. In 2018, 7500 people attended the OMR Conference.

Target audience 
As a B2B trade fair, the OMR Festival is primarily aimed at CEOs, higher-ups and marketing managers from companies of all sizes, who seek information and exchange on the current possibilities and solutions in the digital marketing sector.

History

2019 
2019 was a year of firsts for the OMR Festival. Instead of being scheduled in late February/March as usual, OMR19 moved to May for the first time, taking place on May 7 & 8, 2019. OMR19 also saw the first rendition of the Festival to take up six halls at the Hamburg Convention Center and cracked the 50,000-attendee mark (52,000) for the first time. The Expo portion of the Festival featured 400 exhibitors, 150 Masterclasses, 37 Guided Tours and 100 Side Events. Headlining the Conference on May 8 were New York Times' best-selling author Yuval Noah Harari, Endeavor executive Bozoma Saint John, Headspace CEO Andy Puddicombe, JD.Com CEO Bowen Zhou, The Atlantic journalist Taylor Lorenz and British recording artist Ellie Goulding.

2018 
The OMR Festival 2018 took place on March 22 & 23 in five halls, encompassing 65,000 square meters, at the Hamburg Convention Center. More than 40,000 people and 300 exhibitors from Europe and beyond attended the event. More than 300 speakers and presenters took part in 120 Masterclasses, on two Expo stages and at the Conference. These included Andrus Ansip, Vice President of the European Commission, Nasty Gal founder Sophia Amoruso, Metallica drummer Lars Ulrich, Fitness influencer and entrepreneur Kayla Itsines, En Marche campaign manager Guillaume Liegey, blogger Tim Urban (Wait But Why), Scott Galloway, L2 founder and professor the NYU Stern School of Business, Zalando founder Robert Gentz, Axel Springer SE boss Mathias Döpfner, influencer twins Lisa and Lena, star statistician Nate Silver, investor Frank Thelen, TV presenter Lena Gerke, Douglas CEO Tina Müller, Fashion Designer Magnus Walker, Facebook VP Ads & Business Platform Mark Rabkin and Chief Content Officer at Refinery29 Amy Emmerich.

2017 

The OMR Festival 2017 took place on March 2 and 3, 2017 in three halls at the Hamburg Exhibition Center. Over 200 international exhibitors and approximately 26,000 visitors attended the seventh edition of the OMR Festival. Speakers and guests included former Minister of Economics Brigitte Zypries (SPD) from Germany, entrepreneur Gary Vaynerchuk (VaynerMedia), Iron Maiden singer Bruce Dickinson, Youtuber Casey Neistat, old-school German rappers Beginner, Trivago founder Rolf Schrömgens, Facebook executive Andrew Bosworth and Cambridge Analytica CEO Alexander Nix.

2016 

In 2016, the OMR Festival took place in two halls at the Hamburg Exhibition Center for the first time. 16,533 trade visitors attended the Conference and Expo on February 25 and 26, 2016. Approximately 4900 Conference attendees saw marketing professor Scott Galloway, skateboard legend Tony Hawk, "My Little Paris" founder Fany Péchiodat, Ströer COO Christian Schmalzl, Growth Hacking expert Neil Patel and musician Jan Delay and Udo Lindenberg speak on stage.

2015 
From February 26 to 28, the OMR Conference was expanded to include the OMR Expo, with 50 exhibitors taking part in the format’s first ever rendition. The OMR Conference took place over two days at the Stage Theater im Hafen, while the Expo was held at the Millerntor-Stadion. The Conference and Expo attracted a total of 2500 industry professionals. On stage were, among others, founder mayor of Hamburg Olaf Scholz, digital marketing experts Gary Vaynerchuk, Pinterest founder Evan Sharp, Thales Teixeira, professor for business administration at Harvard School and Benjamin Bak, founder of Lovoo.

2014 
In 2014, the Online Marketing Rockstars Conference took place on February 21 at the Stage-Theater im Hafen and was attended by 2000 people. The agenda consisted of 20 speakers, including BuzzFeed founder Jonah Peretti, who spoke for the first time in Germany. Additional speakers included Harvard Business School professor Ben Edelman, legendary German hip-hop trio Fettes Brot, poetry slammer Julia Engelmann, Selfmade Records founder Elvir Ombergovic and John Battelle, founder of Wired magazine.

2013 

1200 industry visitors attended the third Online Marketing Rockstars Conference on February 22 at Großen Freiheit 36. Youtuber Sami Slimani, former adviser to US President Barack Obama Julius van de Laar, legendary German musician Jan Delay, Mister Spex managers Mirko Caspar and Harvard Professor Jeffrey Rayport gave presentations on the latest developments and trends in digital marketing.

2012 
The second OMR Conference took place on February 24, 2012 at the Große Freiheit 36 venue and was attended by 600 persons. Keynotes were held by Daniel Schiemann, former Marketing service provider of YouPorn, Hamburg Media School professor Dr. Sabine Trepte, Dr. Florian Heinemann (formerly of Rocket Internet) and SEO expert Marcus Tandler.

2011 
The inaugural Online Marketing Rockstars Conference was held on February 11, 2011 at the Bucerius Law School in Hamburg. Approximately 200 guests attended the premier event. Speakers on stage included Idealo founder Martin Sinner and founder of upscale matchmaking service ElitePartner Arne Kahlke.

External links

References 

Technology conferences
Business conferences
Web-related conferences